CQC may  refer to:

 Close Quarters Combat, a type of warfare
 Caiga Quien Caiga, an Argentine television show
 Custe o Que Custar, a Brazilian television show
 Care Quality Commission, a United Kingdom health and social care service regulator
 Catoctin Quaker Camp, a summer camp
 Centre for Quantum Computation, an alliance of quantum information research groups 
 Central Queensland Aviation College's ICAO airline designator
 Complete Quadratic Combination, see Seismic analysis